Chaim Schalk (born April 23, 1986) is a Canadian beach volleyball player. Schalk placed ninth at the 2016 Summer Olympics.

Early life 

Chaim Schalk grew up in Red Deer, Canada. He has four competitive brothers. He grew up learning how to fight and work for everything (including food at the dinner table). Chaim started playing volleyball at age of 12. He and his brothers erected a makeshift net in their backyard. After picking up beach volleyball, he pestered his father to build a sand court where he and his high school friends could play. His father arranged for a truck to dump the sand but he and his friends had to level it out. Chaim credits the backyard beach court for taking him from just enjoying the game, to wanting to really pursue it!

Transition to beach volleyball 

Up until 2009, Chaim’s primary focus was indoor volleyball. He was a setter and a Second-Team All-Canadian while playing for Trinity Western Spartans for two seasons from 2006 to 2008. He also won two National Championships with Red Deer College.

That all changed when Chaim made the Canadian Beach Volleyball National Team and competed on the FIVB World Tour in 2010.

The Albertans 

The two Albertans (Chaim Schalk and Ben Saxton) teamed up near the end of the 2012 season, in part, because both were in favor of spending more time training in California with the top American teams. They won their first tournament together, at a NORCECA event in Chula Vista, cementing the partnership. Another early highlight was a fifth place finish at the 2013 World Championships in Stare Joblonki, Poland, for Canada’s best ever men's result at the global event, after defeating one of the top teams in the world, Latvia’s Janis Smedins and Aleksandrs Samoilovs. Saxton and Schalk went on to reach their first ever FIVB World Tour podium in 2014, claiming bronze at the Parana Open in Argentina. They closed the season with a victory at the NORCECA continental championship. Their 2015 season included podium finishes at the Yokohama and Olsztyn Grand Slam events. They reached a Major Series podium for the first time in July 2016, taking bronze in Porec, Croatia.

2016 Summer Olympics 

In their Olympic debut at Rio 2016, Saxton and Schalk advanced to round 16. Taking ninth place in Men's Beach Volleyball at the 2016 Summer Olympics.

References

External links
 
 

1986 births
Living people
Sportspeople from Red Deer, Alberta
Canadian men's beach volleyball players
Beach volleyball players at the 2016 Summer Olympics
Olympic beach volleyball players of Canada
Trinity Western Spartans volleyball players